"Remember" is a song by English singer and songwriter Becky Hill and French DJ and producer David Guetta. It was released on 18 June 2021 as the fourth single from Hill's debut studio album, Only Honest on the Weekend. The song peaked at number three on the UK Singles Chart, becoming Hill's fourth top ten hit and Guetta's twenty-sixth.

Despite only peaking at #34 on the Australian ARIA Charts, it was the second-most played song on Australian radio in 2022.

Music video 
The music video was directed by Carly Cussan and was released on 25 June 2021, alongside the release of the single.

Personnel 
Credits taken from Tidal.

 David Guetta – production, composer, lyricist, associated performer
 Scott Lowe – additional production 
 Luke Storrs – production, associated performer, keyboards
 Peppe Follerio – mastering engineer, studio personnel
 Mark Ralph – mixer, studio personnel
 Becky Hill – lyricist, vocalist

Charts

Weekly charts

Year-end charts

Certifications

References

2021 singles
2021 songs
Becky Hill songs
David Guetta songs
Song recordings produced by David Guetta
Songs about nostalgia
Songs written by Becky Hill
Songs written by David Guetta
Songs written by Karen Poole